Jæren Sparebank is a Norwegian savings bank, headquartered in Bryne, Norway. The bank's main market is Rogaland.

The bank is one of the owners of Eika Gruppen.

External links
 Official Website

References

Banks of Norway
Companies based in Rogaland
Banks established in 1923
Companies listed on the Oslo Stock Exchange
Norwegian companies established in 1923